Elbert Howard (January 5, 1938 – July 23, 2018), better known as Big Man, was an American civil rights activist and author who was one of the founding members of the Black Panther Party.

Black Panther 

Howard spent several years in the United States Air Force in Europe. After receiving an honorable discharge from the Air Force, Howard moved to Oakland, California. While attending Merritt College, Howard met Bobby Seale and Huey P. Newton. In 1966, at the age of 28, he became one of the six original founding members of the Black Panther Party. The others were Bobby Seale, Huey Newton, "L'il" Bobby Hutton, Reggie Forte and Sherman Forte. Howard was an active member of the Black Panther Party for Self-Defense from 1966 through 1974, and acted as the Party's "Deputy Minister of Information", often functioning as a lead spokesperson for the party while other members were imprisoned.

Post-party 

After leaving the party in 1974, Howard returned to Tennessee. In Memphis, he served on the boards of directors of several African American progressive educational institutions.

In 2001, Howard self-published his memoir, Panther on the Prowl, covering the rise and fall of the Black Panthers. In 2003, he was a coordinator for the All of Us or None Ex-Offender Program, and also was a member of the Millions for Reparations committee.

Later life 

Until his death, Howard lived in Forestville, California with his wife, Carole Hyams. They married in 2007. He was a founder of the Police Accountability Clinic & Helpline of Sonoma County, and a board member of KWTF, a community radio station. As a lifelong lover of America's original musical art form, jazz, he hosted jazz/blues programs at several radio stations.

Howard died on July 23, 2018.

References 

1938 births
2018 deaths
Activists from California
Members of the Black Panther Party
Merritt College alumni
People from Chattanooga, Tennessee
People from Forestville, California
Military personnel from Tennessee
United States Air Force airmen
Writers from Tennessee